Puerto Rico competed at the 1972 Summer Olympics in Munich, West Germany. 53 competitors, all men, took part in 37 events in 10 sports.

Archery

In the first modern archery competition at the Olympics, Puerto Rico entered one man. He came in last place in the men's archery competition.

Men's Individual Competition:
 Ferdinand Vega – 1954 points (55th place)

Athletics

Men's 100 metres
Jorge Vizcarrondo
 First Heat — 10.79s (→ did not advance)

Guillermo González
 First Heat — 10.73s (→ did not advance)

Luis Alers
 First Heat — 11.09s (→ did not advance)

Men's 1500 metres
Anthony Colón
 Heat — 3:44.6 (→ did not advance)

Men's 4 × 100 m Relay
Luis Alers, Guillermo González, Pedro Ferrer, and Jorge Vizcarrondo 
 Heat — 41.34s (→ did not advance)

Basketball

Boxing

Men's Light Middleweight (– 71 kg)
José Antonio Colon
 First Round — Bye 
 Second Round — Lost to Loucif Hanmani (ALG), 0:5

Diving

Men's 10m Platform:
 Hector Bas – 254.79 points (→ 31st place)

Fencing

Two fencers represented Puerto Rico in 1972.

Men's épée
 Roberto Levis
 Roberto Maldonado

Judo

Sailing

Shooting

Eight male shooters represented Puerto Rico in 1972.

25 m pistol
 Simon González
 Fernando Miranda

50 m pistol
 Fernando Miranda
 Santiago Machuca

50 m rifle, prone
 Jaime Santiago
 Manuel Hawayek

50 m running target
 Pedro Ramírez
 Frank Tossas

Skeet
 Rafael Batista

Weightlifting

References

External links
Official Olympic Reports

Nations at the 1972 Summer Olympics
1972 Summer Olympics
1972 in Puerto Rican sports